Kirsten Flipkens and Laura Siegemund defeated Kamilla Rakhimova and Yana Sizikova in the final, 6–3, 7–5 to win the doubles tennis title at the 2022 Transylvania Open.

Irina Bara and Ekaterine Gorgodze were the defending champions, but lost in the first round to Rakhimova and Sizikova.

Seeds

Draw

Draw

References

External links
Main draw

Transylvania Open - Doubles